The 1976 Montana gubernatorial election took place on November 2, 1976. Incumbent Governor of Montana Thomas Lee Judge, who was first elected in 1972, ran for re-election. He won the Democratic primary unopposed, and moved on to the general election, where he was opposed by Bob Woodahl, the Attorney General of Montana and the Republican nominee. Ultimately, Judge defeated Woodahl by a landslide to win his second and final term as governor.

Democratic primary

Candidates
Thomas Lee Judge, incumbent Governor of Montana

Results

Republican primary

Candidates
Bob Woodahl, Attorney General of Montana
Jack McDonald, State Senator

Results

General election

Results

References

Montana
Gubernatorial
1976
November 1976 events in the United States